The 1858 Grand National was the 20th renewal of the Grand National horse race that took place at Aintree near Liverpool, England, on 6 March 1858.

Finishing Order

Non-finishers

References

 1858
Grand National
Grand National
19th century in Lancashire
March 1858 sports events